Jacques Rougerie may refer to:
 Jacques Rougerie (architect) (born 1945),  French architect-oceanographer
 Jacques Rougerie (historian) (1932–2022), historian of the Paris Commune
 Jacques Rougerie (rugby union) (born 1945), French rugby union player